Strait Area Transit is a provider of public transportation based in Inverness County and Richmond County, Nova Scotia, Canada. Established in 2008, it operates not as a government-sponsored agency, but rather as a non-profit cooperative charity. The organization offers daily fixed route, and Dial-A-Ride services in the South-Central Inverness County, Richmond County area.

Routes
1/2 Mainland Richmond: L'Ardoise-St. Peters-River Bourgeois-Louisdale-Lower River-Port Hawkesbury 
3/4 Isle Madame: Port Royal-West Arichat-Arichat-Rocky Bay-D'Ecousse-Poulamon-Louisdale-Lower River-Port Hawkesbury 
5/6 Inverness: Inverness-Mabou-Port Hood-Harbourview-Judique-Troy-Port Hawkesbury, East Lake Ainslie, and Whycocomagh

References

External links
Strait Area Transit
SAT Facebook site

Transit agencies in Nova Scotia
2008 establishments in Nova Scotia